Albert Lyman Cox (December 1, 1883 – April 15, 1965) was an attorney, state legislator, state judge, and U.S. Army major general.

Early years
Albert Lyman Cox was born on December 1, 1883, in Raleigh, North Carolina. His father was Confederate general, judge, and U.S. congressman William Ruffin Cox, son of state senator Thomas Cox of Washington County and grandson of English-born Thomas Cox, a seafaring man, and of Margaret Cheshire Cox of Edenton. His mother Fannie Augusta Lyman Cox was the daughter of Right Reverend Theodore Benedict Lyman, Episcopal Bishop of North Carolina from 1881 to 1893.

College athletics
Cox was an All-Southern college football end for the North Carolina Tar Heels of the University of North Carolina. He was also a member of the baseball and track teams. At UNC, he was a member of Sigma Alpha Epsilon.

First World War
He was the first commander of the 113th Field Artillery Regiment during the First World War.

Political career
In 1909, Cox served in the North Carolina House of Representatives and was a Democrat. In 1916, Cox was appointed North Carolina state superior judge.

Personal
In November 1909, Cox married Miss Arabel Parker Nash of Tarboro.

References

External links

1883 births
1965 deaths
American football ends
North Carolina Tar Heels football players
United States Army generals
North Carolina lawyers
North Carolina Tar Heels baseball players
North Carolina state court judges
Members of the North Carolina House of Representatives
Players of American football from Raleigh, North Carolina
All-Southern college football players
American people of English descent
20th-century American judges